is a former Japanese gravure idol, and female talent. She is from Tokyo, formerly belongs to the show-business production 'Metal Box'. Her nickname is 'Burin' (means a piggie), derives from her hobby collecting pig goods. She is deeply interested in Feng shui.

Profile 
 Nickname:           Burin
 Profession:         Actress and 'gravure idol' (Japanese term: swimsuit/bikini model)
 Date of Birth:      14 February 1985
 Birthplace:         Tokyo, Japan
 Height:             155 cm (5 feet and 1.0 inch)
 Measurements:       B86 W58 H84 cm (B33.9 W22.8 H33.1 inches)       
 Talent Agency:      Metal Box

Filmography

TV Programs 
NANDA!? (TV Asahi)
着信 -Live television- (TV Tokyo)
三竹占い (TV Asahi)
ランク王国SP (TBS)  
あきと由佳のIdol Park 2時間SP (CSエンタ371)
パオパオ アソビ★クリエイターズ (BS Nippon)
ドスペ2「恋のエプロン 新人タレント料理下克上バトル」 (TV Asahi)
白黒アンジャッシュ (Chiba Television)
Xenos (TV Tokyo)

Radio Program(s) 
 nemu RING RING (September 9, 2005; J-WAVE）

sunday 
 すくらんぶる･ハーツ (2004)
 殺人峰 キラー･ビー (2005)
 まいっちんぐマチコ!ビギンズ (2005)

Videos & DVDs 
 Sexy GRAND PRIX, 2004 Mare
 Dream Girl, 2004 G.O.T.
 Pure Smile, 2004 Takeshobo
 Peace!, 2005 For-side.com Co., Ltd.
 白黒アンジャッシュ, 2005 Pony Canyon Inc.
 なつめかん, 2005 Gakken / Sony Music Distribution Inc.
 まいっちんぐマチコ!ビギンズ, 2005 King Records
 夏芽のアルバイト, 2005 For-side.com Co., Ltd.
 D-Splash! 佐野夏芽, 2006 King Records
 ナツメイロ, 2006 VAP
 パイなつプルン, 2006 Japan Home Video (JHV)

Bibliography

Photobooks

Digital 
 Girl's Minute, 2003 LEVEL 4
 SEXY PRIDE, 2003 LEVEL 4
 SHIZUKU (Drops), 2004 LEVEL 4
 Honesty, 2004 LEVEL 4
 Natsume Sano Digital Photobook (佐野夏芽デジタル写真集), 2006 @misty
 Natsume no Arbeit (夏芽のアルバイト / Natsume's Part-time Job), 2006 For-side.com
 Painatsupurun (パイなつプルン / Natsume's Breasts Move up and down), 2006 Line Communications

Normal (Paper) 
 Natsumekan (ナツメカン / Natsume & a Chinese Citron), Gakken 2005
 Natsumeron (なつメロン / Natsume & a Melon), Kodansha 2005
 OtoNatsume (オトナツメ / Matured Natsume), East Press 2006
 Natsu-mail (なつめーる), Wani Books 2008

Others 
 Something ELse's Single "1M" jacket picture, 2003
 PlayStation 2 & Xbox "Red Dead Revolver" image girl, 2005 Capcom
 PlayStation Portable "Metal Gear Acid", 2005 Konami
 'HOT☆FANTASY ODAIBA 2005' image character "Densha Girls", 2005

References

External links 
 Metal Box 
 Official Profile 
 Natsume Sano Official Web-site 
 Photo Diary "Natsu-mail" 
 Natsume's Boolog  - Official Blog with her photographs、since June 2007
 Natsume Sano's Natsu-mail  - Former Official Blog with her photographs, from October 2006 to June 2007
 Natsume Sano's Natsu-mail  - Former Official Blog with her photographs, from August 2004 to September 2006
 "Monthly Charger" Idol Interview Vol.16: Natsume Sano  - In October 2006
 JUICY x JUICY vol.30 Natsume Sano 
 MouRa 
 "Natsumeron" Bonus Site  - In October 2005
 "Girls on the Web" FILE.121: Natsume Sano (September 30, 2005)  - Her interview and photo gallery
  
 Sano, Natsume Picture Gallery

Japanese gravure idols
Japanese television personalities
1985 births
Living people
People from Tokyo